Sancak Kaplan (born 25 May 1982) is a Turkish former professional footballer who played as a defender.

References

1982 births
Living people
People from Oltu
Turkish footballers
Malatyaspor footballers
Adanaspor footballers
Altay S.K. footballers
İstanbul Başakşehir F.K. players
Kasımpaşa S.K. footballers
Süper Lig players
Association football defenders